Neugebauer is a German surname. Notable people with the surname include:

Alfred Neugebauer, Austrian film actor
Fritz Neugebauer, Second President of the National Council of Austria
Gerry Neugebauer, American astronomer
Hans E J Neugebauer, German-American imaging scientist
Hartmut Neugebauer, German actor, voice actor and dialogue director
Jari Neugebauer, German ice hockey player
Karin Neugebauer, German freestyle swimmer
Lila Neugebauer, American theatre director
Marcia Neugebauer, American geophysicist
Mieczysław Norwid-Neugebauer, minister in the interwar Polish government
Otto E. Neugebauer, Austrian-American mathematician and historian of science
Rainer O. Neugebauer, German educationalist, historian and social scientist
Reimund Neugebauer, German mechanical engineer and professor 
Randy Neugebauer, U.S. congressman
Rudolf Neugebauer, German SS Hauptsturmführer during the Nazi era
Toby Neugebauer, American businessman
Tomasz Neugebauer, Polish footballer
Ursula Neugebauer, German artist
Veronika Neugebauer, German actress and voice actress
Walter Neugebauer, Croatian comic book artist

 Other uses
 , a Brazilian chocolate manufacturing company

See also
Neugebauer equations, a simplified model for the color of halftones
Neubauer
Gebauer

German-language surnames
Occupational surnames